Horford is a surname. Notable people with the surname include:

Al Horford (born 1986), Dominican Republic basketball player
Jon Horford (born 1991), American basketball player
Tito Horford (born 1966), Dominican Republic basketball player

See also
Morford